Whitehall, Pennsylvania may refer to:
 Whitehall, Adams County, Pennsylvania in Adams County, Pennsylvania
 Whitehall, Allegheny County, Pennsylvania 
 Whitehall Township, Lehigh County, Pennsylvania
 Whitehall Borough, Pennsylvania, a defunct borough now part of the city of Philadelphia